Indonesia competed in the 2021 Asian Youth Para Games which will be held in Manama, Bahrain from 2 to 6 December 2021. Indonesia contingent has 35 athletes who will compete in seven sports.

Edward Hutahayan, treasure of the National Paralympic Committee of Indonesia, is the chef de mission of the delegation.

Due to non-compliance with the new Anti-Doping rules by the World Anti-Doping Agency (WADA), Indonesia were not allowed to be represented by their flag. As a replacement, they used a flag with NPC Indonesia emblem.

Competitors
The following is the list of number of competitors in the Games:

Medalists

Medals

Boccia

Men

Women

Mixed

References

Indonesia 2021
Asian Youth Para Games
Asian Youth Para Games, 2021
Nations at the 2021 Asian Youth Para Games